Talis evidens is a moth in the family Crambidae. It is found in Russia.

References

Ancylolomiini
Moths described in 1979
Moths of Asia